Dostana is a 1980 Indian Hindi action drama film, written by Salim–Javed, produced by Yash Johar, and directed by Raj Khosla. The film stars Amitabh Bachchan, Shatrughan Sinha, Zeenat Aman in lead roles and Prem Chopra, Amrish Puri, Helen, Pran in supporting roles. The film was a huge hit at the box-office and became the fourth highest-grosser of 1980, behind Qurbani, Asha and Ram Balram. Dostana was one of the last successful films directed by Raj Khosla. The film was remade in Tamil as Sattam with Kamal Haasan.

Plot
Vijay (Amitabh Bachchan) and Ravi (Shatrughan Sinha) are best friends who do not question each other about their careers. Vijay is a police officer and Ravi is a lawyer. While Vijay catches criminals (with the help of an informant named Tony (Pran), Ravi bails those criminals out and is employed by Daaga (Prem Chopra). One day both Vijay and Ravi meet Sheetal (Zeenat Aman) at different places and times, and both fall in love with her. While Vijay’s love is more vocal and is reciprocated by Sheetal. Ravi has one-sided crush on Sheetal who only sees him as a friend.

Ravi admits his love for Sheetal to Vijay who is devastated but decides to sacrifice his love for Ravi's sake. He writes a letter to her saying that they have to give up their relationship for Ravi which accidentally reaches Ravi first, but he doesn't read it. Daaga finds out about Vijay and Sheetal's relationship through a photograph  and decides to stir up Vijay and Ravi's friendship by revealing Vijay and Sheetal's relationship to Ravi. Vijay and Ravi become rivals for the first time and Ravi takes Daaga's side in return for making Vijay's life hell. One day, Tony tells Vijay his story: he was in charge of the checkpoints that check trucks. He was threatened by an unknown criminal (apparently Daaga) to let a certain truck through without checking, but he refuses and tips the police off to the truck. In retaliation, Daaga sends a truck to run over him and his family, killing his wife and disabling his son Johnny in the legs. Later, Daaga frames Vijay for killing a criminal he was interrogating for info on Daaga. Ravi defends him on the condition that Sheetal sleeps with him for one night. On the night, he finds and reads the letter that Vijay wrote to Sheetal and repents and rekindles his friendship with Vijay.

Just then, Daaga captures them. Vijay comes to the rescue, but is also captured. Daaga's moll Sylvia (Helen), who is really a spy, and Tony's wife's sister, that gives Tony his info, saves them. Daaga fatally shots Tony, who dies in Vijay's arms with the final wish that Vijay takes care of Johnny, and escapes with Balwant Singh in a plane, but is forced to land by Ravi and Vijay, who are using a jeep and helicopter. Balwant Singh was shot by Daaga because he couldn't run due to ankle sprain while jumping off the charter plane. Daaga attempts to escape , but is caught by Vijay. He tried to shoot Vijay with a pocket gun and got shot dead in return by Vijay instead.

Cast

Amitabh Bachchan as CID Inspector Vijay Verma
Shatrughan Sinha as Advocate Ravi Kapoor
Zeenat Aman as Sheetal Sahni
Prem Chopra as Daaga
Amrish Puri as Balwant Singh
Helen as Sylvia
Pran as Tony
Gajanan Jagirdar as High School Principal
Sajjan as Ramniklal Tiwari
Trilok Kapoor as Police Commissioner
Iftekhar as Prosecuting Lawyer
K. N. Singh as Judge
Paintal as Eve-Teaser
Jagdish Raj as Driver (Daaga's Man)
Sharat Saxena as Photographer (Daaga's Man)
Mohan Sherry as Daaga's Man
Keshav Rana as Daaga's Man
Mac Mohan as Daaga's Man
Sudhir as Inspector Shinde
Goga Kapoor as Baldev Singh
Yunus Parvez as Gold Smuggler
Vikas Anand as Dr. Karamchandani
Ruby Mayer as Nun
Sudha Chopra as Teresa
Master Rajesh Valecha as Johny
Raj Kumar Kapoor as Mr. Sahni

In a scene from the film, Amitabh Bachchan beats Sajjan in the prison, who is later killed by another prisoner. This scene was lifted by Raj Khosla from his previous directorial C.I.D. (1956), where the same circumstances were faced by Dev Anand.

Coincidentally, Karan Johar, the son of the film's producer Yash Johar, also went on to produce a film of the same name starring Abhishek Bachchan (Amitabh Bachchan's son), John Abraham and Priyanka Chopra.

Soundtrack
The music for Dostana was composed by the duo Laxmikant–Pyarelal and the lyrics were written by Anand Bakshi.

Awards

 28th Filmfare Awards:

Nominated

 Best Actor – Amitabh Bachchan
 Best Actor – Shatrughan Sinha
 Best Lyricist – Anand Bakshi for "Salamat Rahe Dostana Humara"
 Best Male Playback Singer – Mohammed Rafi for "Mere Dost Kissa Yeh Kya Ho Gaya"

References

External links
 

1980 films
1980s Hindi-language films
1980s action drama films
1980s buddy films
Films directed by Raj Khosla
Films scored by Laxmikant–Pyarelal
Hindi films remade in other languages
Indian action drama films
Indian buddy films
Films with screenplays by Salim–Javed
1980s Urdu-language films
Urdu films remade in other languages
1980 drama films
Urdu-language Indian films